Witold Rajmund Gadomski (born 21 November 1967) is a Polish fencer. He competed in the individual and team épée events at the 1988 and 1992 Summer Olympics.

References

External links
 

1967 births
Living people
Polish male épée fencers
Olympic fencers of Poland
Fencers at the 1988 Summer Olympics
Fencers at the 1992 Summer Olympics
Fencers from Warsaw
20th-century Polish people
21st-century Polish people